Baya Gamani of Singu (also spelled Bhayakamani) was a 15th-century court minister and royal army commander in the service of seven kings of Ava from Minkhaung I to Narapati I. He also served two terms as governor of Singu (–1426), and (1427–). He is best remembered in Burmese history for his steadfast support of King Kale Kye-Taung Nyo during the king's embattled 7-month reign (1425–1426). Though subsequently imprisoned by the next king Mohnyin Thado, Gamani was restored to his prior post at Singu in 1427 after his successful defense of the Ava (Inwa) capital region. The elder brother of Chief Minister Yazathingyan, Baya Gamani served as a senior minister and commander alongside his more famous brother at least until 1443.

Career

Loyal vassal of Ava (1401–1425)

The first mention of him in the royal chronicles is  when King Minkhaung I of Ava appointed one Baya Gamani governor of Singu, a small outpost 100 km north of the capital Ava (Inwa) at the foot of the Shan Hills. The king also appointed Gamani's younger middle brother governor of Siboktara with the title of Yazathingyan. The brothers were part of the loyalists installed by the new king who was facing several internal and external challenges to his rule. Starting out as cavalry battalion commanders, the duo quickly rose to become regimental commanders, and participated in several military campaigns, most notably in the decades-long war against the southern Hanthawaddy Kingdom until 1423.

Ava succession crisis (1425–1426)

In 1425, the brothers became ensnarled in the succession crisis at the palace. That year, Queen Shin Bo-Me engineered the assassinations of kings Thihathu, and Min Hla within a three-month span, and placed her lover Prince Nyo of Kale on the throne in November. Many vassals viewed the couple's power grab as illegitimate, leading one major vassal ruler, Sawbwa Thado of Mohnyin to formally revolt in February 1426. Gamani, who had previously served under Nyo's command, was one of the few vassals that openly supported the prince. Yazathingyan and their youngest brother, Yan-Lo Kywe, an army commander, also sided with Nyo. 

However, Gamani was the only one to stay with Nyo to the end. Even as Thado's forces closed in on Ava in May 1426, and most of the vassals renounced their allegiance to Nyo, Gamani and Yazathingyan continued to lead a severely depleted Ava court. Gamani advised Nyo to leave Ava for Arakan, and return with a larger force. Nyo accepted the recommendation but almost everyone else refused to come along. In the end, under the cover of darkness, only Gamani and his small battalion escorted the usurping couple out of Ava. His two brothers stayed behind and surrendered.

Gamani and the royal couple first ventured south by land along the Irrawaddy before sailing down to Salin. From there, they trekked west. Just a few days later, as they prepared to cross the Arakan Hills at Pe-Lun-Taung, west of present-day Shwesettaw, Nyo suddenly fell ill and died. After Nyo's death, Gamani, ignoring Bo-Me's fierce protests, stopped the journey, and waited to be arrested by the pursuing troops. While she became a queen of Thado, Gamani was put in prison.

Brief imprisonment and return to royal service (1426–1427)

Yazathingyan, who became the chief minister of the new king, may have kept his older brother alive but could not keep him out of prison. For the next year and a half, Gamani was imprisoned in iron ankle shackles. His opportunity to escape came in late 1427 when an invasion force led by Prince Minye Kyawhtin, a claimant to the Ava throne, rapidly advanced towards Ava. The invasion caught the Ava command completely off guard since they had considered their victory over Kyawhtin's rebel army at Yenantha a year earlier to be decisive. More ominously, Thado did not have enough troops or experienced commanders to defend the capital region as he had just rushed down most of his forces to the south to meet the Hanthawaddy forces that had occupied the southernmost districts of Prome (Pyay). Desperate, the king asked Gamani to take command of a 1000-man regiment to hold the outer perimeter. Gamani agreed, and proved his worth. His regiment defeated Kyawhtin's forces at Tabetswe, 25 km southeast of Ava, and pushed them back to Pinle, about 70 km southeast of Ava.

Although the victory was limited—Kyawhtin would hold on to Pinle until 1445—Thado was grateful. The king not only restored Gamani to the governorship of Singu but also allowed him to collect as much gold from the royal gold vault in one scoop with his two hands each day for seven consecutive days. With the gold, Gamani built a Buddhist pagoda named A-Shay-Pyay Neibban in Tabetswe.

Later years (1427–)
Baya Gamani became a loyal vassal of King Thado. Though his career was not as distinguished as his brother Yazathingyan who became chief minister under Thado and two successor kings, Gamani twice participated in unsuccessful expeditions to Pinle under the command of the crown prince Minye Kyawswa (1428–1429 and 1433–1434). When Minye Kyawswa became king, he and Yazathingyan co-led the campaign that recaptured the rebellious southeastern vassal states of Taungdwin and Toungoo (Taungoo) in 1441. His last known military service came in 1443 when he was still a minister at the court. As the Chinese forces invaded, King Narapati appointed his eldest son and crown prince Thihathura of Ava, and Baya Gamani as the commanders of the forces to guard the capital while he marched to meet the enemy.

It was the last mention of Gamani in the chronicles. He is not mentioned when King Narapati appointed his son-in-law Min Phyu governor of Sagaing and the ten northern towns, which likely included Singu, in 1450 (or 1460). In contrast, chronicles do mention his brother who was also affected by the Min Phyu appointment: the king reappointed Yazathingyan, the previous governor of Sagaing, to Amyint.

Personal life
Baya Gamani is also remembered for his magnanimous treatment of his unfaithful wife. According to the chronicles Yazawin Thit and Hmannan Yazawin, one day Gamani got home from a military expedition earlier than originally planned, and caught his wife and her lover in the bedroom. Furious, he reached for his sword but ultimately decided not to do anything in the heat of the moment. He turned back, and went on to join another military mission. After the second mission, apparently with a cooler head, he not only gave his wife an amicable divorce but also married her with her lover, and gave the couple part of his estate. His self-restraint and magnanimity towards the couple became part of the lore, passed down by successive chroniclers.

Military service
The following is a list of military campaigns in which his name is explicitly mentioned as a commander in the chronicles. Although he likely participated in the other campaigns against Hanthawaddy, and against the Chinese incursions, chronicles do not provide specific commander lists for those campaigns.

Notes

References

Bibliography
 
 
 
 
 
 

Ava dynasty
Ministers of Ava Kingdom